Hu Jianguan (born 11 May 1993) is a Chinese male boxer. He won the bronze medal in the men's 52 kg at the 2016 Olympics in Rio de Janeiro, Brazil.

References

External links
 
 
 
 

1993 births
Living people
People from Shangrao
Sportspeople from Jiangxi
Chinese male boxers
Olympic boxers of China
Boxers at the 2016 Summer Olympics
Boxers at the 2020 Summer Olympics
Olympic bronze medalists for China
Olympic medalists in boxing
Medalists at the 2016 Summer Olympics
Boxers at the 2018 Asian Games
Asian Games competitors for China
AIBA World Boxing Championships medalists
Flyweight boxers
21st-century Chinese people